Kelly Poon (born 11 July 1983) is a Singaporean singer who emerged from one of the Project SuperStar singing competition held in Singapore.

Early life
Kelly Poon graduated from Huamin Primary School and Yishun Town Secondary School. She later graduated from Singapore Polytechnic with a Diploma in Maritime Transport Management in 2004.

After graduation in 2004, she became an air stewardess with Singapore Airlines.

Entertainment career (2005–present)
Kelly Poon auditioned for Project SuperStar in April 2005 and was eliminated in the fourth quarter-final, but was back on stage following sufficient public votes in the revival round. She supposedly impressed both the critics and the judges with her on-stage personality and versatility, and then came in second in the Grand Finals of Project Superstar whilst securing a recording deal with Universal Music.

She released her first album Love Me, Kelly on 14 February 2006 in Singapore. Later, Poon signed a management contract with Yao Chien and released her 2nd album In the Heart of the World in Singapore and Taiwan. Her third album, Smiling Kelly, was released on 22 October 2008 in Taiwan. By the end of 2010, she ended her contract with Yao Chien and signed with Rock Records in the same year, releasing her fourth album Super Kelly on 29 July 2011 in Taiwan and 3 August 2011 in Singapore.

In 2013, Poon hosted her first television show 女人我最大 新加坡, working with Pauline Lan.

Poon moved to Mode Entertainment in Singapore and Cosmos Entertainment in Taiwan in 2014. Her most recent EP Miss Kelly was released in July 2014. Poon was appointed as spokesperson of casual clothing brand dENiZEN in 2015. Her most recent Album Miss Kelly was released in July 2014, consisting of her compositions too. In the same year, Kelly was awarded an Singapore Golden Melody Award and also won an award at the Global Chinese Music Awards. She then also acted in a movie with Tender Huang in 2017.

Personal life
Poon suggested that she suffers from keloid problems, meaning that she scars easily after a wound heals, "if a mosquito bites me, it takes very long for the bite to heal". Her mother is known to worry about Poon.

Discography

Since her debut in 2005, Kelly has released 1 single and 4 albums:

Singles

Albums

Filmography

Music videos
 Self, Love me, Kelly - Debut, 《愛，無力》(2006)
 Self, Love me, Kelly - Debut, 《計時炸彈》(2006)
 Self, [[Hello Kelly - Debut Taiwan|在世界中心]], 《Shakalaka Baby》(2007)
 Self, [[Hello Kelly - Debut Taiwan|在世界中心]], 《在世界中心》(2007)
 Self, [[Hello Kelly - Debut Taiwan|在世界中心]], 《一秒鐘的永遠》(2007)
 Self, [[Hello Kelly - Debut Taiwan|在世界中心]], 《溺愛》(2007)
 Self, [[Hello Kelly - Debut Taiwan|在世界中心]], 《印象派的愛情》(2007)
 Self, Smiling Kelly, 《限時的遺忘》(2008)
 Self, Smiling Kelly, 《愛我100分鐘》(2008)
 Self, Smiling Kelly, 《維多利亞的愛》(2008)
 Self, Smiling Kelly, 《春去春又回》(2008)
 Self, 超給麗, 《Happy Searching 快樂收尋》(2011)
 Self, 超給麗, 《No More Tears 說不哭》(2011)
 Self, Super Kelly|超給麗, 《My Love 陪我到最後》(2011)
 Self, Miss Kelly | 情人嘉麗, 《情人》(2014)
 Self, Miss Kelly | 情人嘉麗, 《小丑》(2014)
 Self, Miss Kelly | 情人嘉麗, 《Goodbye》(2014)

Drama

Awards and achievements
 Project Superstar Season 1 Female Champion – Singapore
 最有潜力新人奖: 雪碧榜 – Shanghai
 最有潜力新人奖: 新城國語力 – Hong Kong
 區域傑出歌手獎 – 新加坡: 第19屆 新加坡金曲獎 – Singapore

Star Awards

References

External links

 
 
 
 Weibo

Living people
Singapore Polytechnic alumni
Singaporean people of Cantonese descent
Kelly Poon albums
21st-century Singaporean women singers
Singaporean Mandopop singers
1983 births